The National Black Network, or NBN, began operation on July 2, 1973 as the first coast-to-coast radio network wholly owned by African Americans.

Early years
The idea for a National Black Network was conceived by former ABC Radio and Mutual Broadcasting System President Robert Pauley in 1969 as a way to utilize Mutual's contracted but unused network lines for the benefit of African-Americans. The goal was to tie together the 117 black-oriented radio stations in the country.

Pauley, a white American, was unable to organize the niche African American oriented news business and therefore turned to Eugene D. Jackson, an African American electrical engineer working as a consultant raising capital for black business investments. Sydney L. Small, a former employee of ABC Radio Network was recruited to join the group. Mr. Pauley finally became frustrated with the difficult task of raising the $1,000,000 in capital needed to start the operation and abandon the effort. Jackson and Small along with Del Raycee of Mutual Broadcasting System persevered and finally launch the National Black Network on July 2, 1972 in New York City with 25 affiliates.

NBN aired 5-minute newscasts at the hour and sportscasts several times a day at the half-hour. NBN also aired a wide variety of public affairs programs and a live overnight talk show hosted by Bob Law. In 1972 there were only 17 African American owned radio stations even though there were over 125 African American oriented station in the country, and by 1976 Eugene D. Jackson became the only African American on the 125 member board of directors of the National Association of Broadcasters (NAB).

With over 80 affiliates associated with NBN, Jackson wanted to see more radio stations owned by African Americans and therefore, conceived and started the National Association of Black Owned Broadcasters (NABOB) in Atlanta as a complement to his position on the NAB Board. Within 15 years, the number of African American owned radio station moved to almost 50 through the creation of Broadcap, a capital raising institution formed by the NAB and the captains of the television and radio industry.  In the early 1980s NBN offered a second news service, American Urban Information Radio, which broadcast an hourly newscast at 50 minutes past the hour, but concentrated on in-depth reporting. By the early 1990s, NBN merged with its main competitor, the Sheridan Broadcasting Network (formerly the Mutual Black Network), to form the American Urban Radio Networks.

The first news director was Roy N. Wood Sr., from the famed Chicago radio station WVON, "The voice of the Negro." In 1975 Roy Wood was replaced by Vince Sanders, another Chicago area talent and veteran of local black-formatted radio. Sanders, served as Vice President of Broadcast Operations at NBN until its demise in 1995. He joined NBN following 3 years with NBC news and its Chicago owned-and-operated station: WMAQ-AM. Before NBC, Sanders was a talk show host for 8 years at WBEE-AM in the Chicago market.  His final assignment with NBN Broadcasting included vice president and general manager of its
New York City station, WWRL-AM.

Small and Jackson hired WABC's Malvin (Mal) Russell Goode to be a senior consultant and the network's United Nations correspondent. Working for ABC, Mr. Goode gained notoriety while being stationed at the UN, reporting the responses of President John F. Kennedy to the Bay of Pigs Invasion initiative of Fidel Castro. Mr. Goode continued working as a senior UN correspondent for National Black Network until 1991 when the two largest black radio networks in American merged to form the American Urban Radio Networks. Eugene Jackson and Sidney Small dissolved their partnership shortly before this merger, leaving Small to form the alliance with Ronald R. Davenport of the Sheridan Broadcasting Network.

Notable personalities 
Long before Bob Law gained fame with "Night Talk," there were a number of Black radio stars on the airwaves at NBN, such as Frank Bannister Jr., who also wrote the "Black College Polls" for Jet Magazine each week. The heavyweight boxing champion Muhammad Ali made his presence known visiting Frank Bannister after a defeat to Leon Spinks. After his death from a heart attack, Bannister was replaced by Ron Pinkney, a former colleague of Gerald Bentley and Ed Castleberry, who were already on the airwaves of NBN.

Roy Wood's "One Black Man's Opinion" was a major showcase of the former-WVON anchor, allowing him a no-holds-barred avenue to the listeners each week. Joseph "Joe" Brown hosted "Black Issues In The Black Press," another weekly news program that focused on the issues of the day. The guest and talented performers ranged from Judge Bruce Wright to Evelyn "Champagne" King.

Eddie Kendricks and David Ruffin of The Temptations were seen joking and laughing it up with Ed Castleberry before airtime. Castleberry made his mark working with Larry Dean at Cincinnati's famed WCIN. Many in the business knew that Castleberry and "Gentleman" Dean were the real models for Venus Flytrap and Dr. Johnny Fever of television's WKRP in Cincinnati.

Locations 
NBN moved from 1350 Avenue of the Americas, New York City, to 10 Columbus Circle, and ended its reign at 4130 58th Street, Woodside, Queens. This was the same location that housed WWRL, a 1960s Black radio powerhouse that helped launch the career of black radio personality Francis "Frankie" Edward Crocker.

References

External links 
 American Urban Radio Networks

African-American culture
Defunct radio networks in the United States
African-American mass media
Organizations established in 1973
Organizations disestablished in 1995 
Radio stations disestablished in 1995 
Radio stations established in 1973
Defunct radio stations in the United States